TJD may refer to:

 Temporomandibular joint dysfunction
 Julian day
 Trayce Jackson-Davis, American basketball player